Morten Hviid, MA (Warwick), Cand Oecon (Aarhus), PhD (Warwick), is Professor of Competition Law at the University of East Anglia. He has previously held posts in the Economics Departments at University of Copenhagen and University of Warwick and in the School of Economic and Social Studies, University of East Anglia. He has published in both fields, including papers in Economic Journal, European Competition Journal, International Journal of Industrial Organization, Journal of Law and Economics and Oxford Journal of Legal Studies. He is a founding member and a principal investigator of the ESRC Centre for Competition Policy and has acted as an advisor to the Office of Fair Trading and the Department of Constitutional Affairs. He is a former editor of the Journal of Industrial Economics and associate editor of the International Journal of Industrial Organization. He is also a former member of the Executive Committee of the European Association for Research in Industrial Economics (EARIE).

Personal life
In 1994, Hviid married Catherine Waddams.

Bibliography 
 Scott, A, M. Hviid and B. Lyons, 2005, Merger Control in the UK, Oxford University Press.
 Working Papers

References

External links 
 First Website at UEA
 Second Website at UEA

Living people
Alumni of the University of Warwick
Academics of the University of East Anglia
Year of birth missing (living people)